River turtles may refer to:

 Emydidae, a family of freshwater river turtles including pond turtles, map turtles, box turtles, cooters and sliders
 Dermatemydidae, a family of turtles
 Central American river turtle, the only extant species of Dermatemydidae
 Geoemydidae or Asian river turtles, a diverse family  of turtles found in Asia
 Podocnemididae, a family  of turtles occasionally called the American sideneck river turtles

See also 

 River turtle (disambiguation)
 

Animal common name disambiguation pages